This is a list of Dutch television related events from 1955.

Events

Debuts

Television shows

Ending this year

Births
25 March - Patty Brard, singer & TV presenter
20 October - Robert ten Brink, TV presenter & actor

Deaths